Blanchard is an unincorporated census-designated place in Bonner County, Idaho, United States. Blanchard has a post office with ZIP code 83804. As of the 2010 census, its population was 261.

Notable person

Heather Scott, member of the Idaho House of Representatives.

History
A post office called White was established in 1903, but in 1908, the name was changed to Blanchard. The present name honors John Blanchard, a pioneer settler.

Blanchard's population was estimated at 100 in 1960.

References

Census-designated places in Bonner County, Idaho
Census-designated places in Idaho